This is a List of birds of Guadalupe Mountains National Park, which is in the U.S. state of Texas. Unless otherwise stated, this list is based on a list published by the U.S. National Park Service (NPS).  The NPS list contains 269 species when taxonomic changes have been taken into account.

This list is presented in the taxonomic sequence of the Check-list of North and Middle American Birds, 7th edition through the 63rd Supplement, published by the American Ornithological Society (AOS). Common and scientific names are also those of the Check-list, except that the common names of families are from the Clements taxonomy because the AOS list does not include them.

The following tags define some categories of occurrence.

(PP) Probably Present per the NPS (27 species)
(UC) Unconfirmed per the NPS (3 species)
(I) Introduced - a species established solely as result of direct or indirect human intervention (4 species)

Ducks, geese, and waterfowl
Order: AnseriformesFamily: Anatidae

Anatidae includes the ducks and most duck-like waterfowl, such as geese and swans. These birds are adapted to an aquatic existence with webbed feet, bills which are flattened to a greater or lesser extent, and feathers that are excellent at shedding water due to special oils.

Snow goose, Anser caerulescens (PP)
Canada goose, Branta canadensis (PP)
Wood duck, Aix sponsa 
Blue-winged teal, Spatula discors (PP)
Cinnamon teal, Spatula cyanoptera (PP)
Northern shoveler, Spatula clypeata (PP)
Gadwall, Mareca strepera (PP)
American wigeon, Mareca americana 
Mallard, Anas platyrhynchos 
Green-winged teal, Anas crecca 
Ring-necked duck, Aythya collaris 
Common merganser, Mergus merganser (PP)

New World quail
Order: GalliformesFamily: Odontophoridae

The New World quails are small, plump terrestrial birds only distantly related to the quails of the Old World, but named for their similar appearance and habits.

Northern bobwhite, Colinus virginianus 
Scaled quail, Callipepla squamata
Gambel's quail, Callipepla gambelii 
Montezuma quail, Cyrtonyx montezumae

Pheasants, grouse, and allies
Order: GalliformesFamily: Phasianidae

Phasianidae consists of the pheasants and their allies. These are terrestrial species, variable in size but generally plump with broad relatively short wings. Many species are gamebirds or have been domesticated as a food source for humans.

Wild turkey, Meleagris gallopavo 
Ring-necked pheasant, Phasianus colchicus (I)

Grebes
Order: PodicipediformesFamily: Podicipedidae

Grebes are small to medium-large freshwater diving birds. They have lobed toes and are excellent swimmers and divers. However, they have their feet placed far back on the body, making them quite ungainly on land.

Pied-billed grebe, Podilymbus podiceps (PP)

Pigeons and doves
Order: ColumbiformesFamily: Columbidae

Pigeons and doves are stout-bodied birds with short necks and short slender bills with a fleshy cere. They feed on seeds, fruit, and plants.

Rock pigeon, Columba livia (I) 
Band-tailed pigeon, Patagioenas fasciata 
Inca dove, Columbina inca (PP)
White-winged dove, Zenaida asiatica
Mourning dove, Zenaida macroura

Cuckoos
Order: CuculiformesFamily: Cuculidae

The family Cuculidae includes cuckoos, roadrunners, and anis. These birds are of variable size with slender bodies, long tails, and strong legs.

Yellow-billed cuckoo, Coccyzus americanus (PP)
Greater roadrunner, Geococcyx californianus

Nightjars and allies
Order: CaprimulgiformesFamily: Caprimulgidae

Nightjars are medium-sized nocturnal birds that usually nest on the ground. They have long wings, short legs, and very short bills. Most have small feet, of little use for walking, and long pointed wings. Their soft plumage is cryptically colored to resemble bark or leaves.

Lesser nighthawk,  Chordeiles acutipennis 
Common nighthawk,  Chordeiles minor 
Common poorwill,  Phalaenoptilus nuttallii 
Mexican whip-poor-will, Antrostomus arizonae

Swifts
Order: ApodiformesFamily: Apodidae

The swifts are small birds which spend the majority of their lives flying. These birds have very short legs and never settle voluntarily on the ground, perching instead only on vertical surfaces. Many swifts have long swept-back wings which resemble a crescent or boomerang.

Black swift, Cypseloides niger (UC)
White-throated swift, Aeronautes saxatalis

Hummingbirds
Order: ApodiformesFamily: Trochilidae

Hummingbirds are small birds capable of hovering in mid-air due to the rapid flapping of their wings. They are the only birds that can fly backwards.

Rivoli's hummingbird, Eugenes fulgens 
Blue-throated mountain-gem, Lampornis clemenciae 
Ruby-throated hummingbird, Archilochus colubris 
Black-chinned hummingbird, Archilochus alexandri 
Calliope hummingbird, Selasphorus calliope 
Rufous hummingbird, Selasphorus rufus 
Broad-tailed hummingbird, Selasphorus platycercus 
Broad-billed hummingbird, Cynanthus latirostris 
White-eared hummingbird, Basilinna leucotis

Rails, gallinules, and coots
Order: GruiformesFamily: Rallidae

Rallidae is a large family of small to medium-sized birds which includes the rails, crakes, coots, and gallinules. The most typical family members occupy dense vegetation in damp environments near lakes, swamps, or rivers. In general they are shy and secretive birds, making them difficult to observe. Most species have strong legs and long toes which are well adapted to soft uneven surfaces. They tend to have short, rounded wings and to be weak fliers.

American coot, Fulica americana

Cranes
Order: GruiformesFamily: Gruidae

Cranes are large, long-legged, and long-necked birds. Unlike the similar-looking but unrelated herons, cranes fly with necks outstretched, not pulled back. Most have elaborate and noisy courting displays or "dances".

Sandhill crane, Antigone canadensis

Plovers and lapwings
Order: CharadriiformesFamily: Charadriidae

The family Charadriidae includes the plovers, dotterels, and lapwings. They are small to medium-sized birds with compact bodies, short thick necks, and long, usually pointed, wings. They are found in open country worldwide, mostly in habitats near water.

Killdeer, Charadrius vociferus

Sandpipers and allies
Order: CharadriiformesFamily: Scolopacidae

Scolopacidae is a large diverse family of small to medium-sized shorebirds including the sandpipers, curlews, godwits, shanks, tattlers, woodcocks, snipes, dowitchers, and phalaropes. The majority of these species eat small invertebrates picked out of the mud or soil. Different lengths of legs and bills enable multiple species to feed in the same habitat, particularly on the coast, without direct competition for food.

Long-billed curlew, Numenius americanus (PP)
Wilson's snipe, Gallinago delicata 
Spotted sandpiper, Actitis macularia

Gulls, terns, and skimmers
Order: CharadriiformesFamily: Laridae
 
Laridae is a family of medium to large seabirds and includes gulls, terns, and skimmers. Gulls are typically gray or white, often with black markings on the head or wings. They have stout, longish bills and webbed feet. Terns are a group of generally medium to large seabirds typically with grey or white plumage, often with black markings on the head. Most terns hunt fish by diving but some pick insects off the surface of fresh water. Terns are generally long-lived birds, with several species known to live in excess of 30 years. Skimmers are a small family of tropical tern-like birds. They have an elongated lower mandible which they use to feed by flying low over the water surface and skimming the water for small fish.

Ring-billed gull, Larus delawarensis 
Herring gull, Larus argentatus

Herons, egrets, and bitterns
Order: PelecaniformesFamily: Ardeidae

The family Ardeidae contains the herons, egrets, and bitterns. Herons and egrets are medium to large wading birds with long necks and legs. Bitterns tend to be shorter necked and more secretive. Members of Ardeidae fly with their necks retracted, unlike other long-necked birds such as storks, ibises, and spoonbills.

Great blue heron, Ardea herodias 
Great egret, Ardea alba 
Snowy egret, Egretta thula 
Tricolored heron, Egretta tricolor (PP)
Cattle egret, Bubulcus ibis

Ibises and spoonbills
Order: PelecaniformesFamily: Threskiornithidae

The family Threskiornithidae includes the ibises and spoonbills. They have long, broad wings. Their bodies tend to be elongated, the neck more so, with rather long legs. The bill is also long, decurved in the case of the ibises, straight and distinctively flattened in the spoonbills.

White ibis, Eudocimus albus (PP)

New World vultures
Order: CathartiformesFamily: Cathartidae

The New World vultures are not closely related to Old World vultures, but superficially resemble them because of convergent evolution. Like the Old World vultures, they are scavengers. However, unlike Old World vultures, which find carcasses by sight, New World vultures have a good sense of smell with which they locate carcasses.

Turkey vulture, Cathartes aura

Osprey
Order: AccipitriformesFamily: Pandionidae

Pandionidae is a monotypic family of fish-eating birds of prey.  Its single species possesses a very large and powerful hooked beak, strong legs, strong talons, and keen eyesight.

Osprey, Pandion haliaetus

Hawks, eagles, and kites
Order: AccipitriformesFamily: Accipitridae

Accipitridae is a family of birds of prey which includes hawks, eagles, kites, harriers, and Old World vultures. These birds have very large powerful hooked beaks for tearing flesh from their prey, strong legs, powerful talons, and keen eyesight.

Golden eagle, Aquila chrysaetos
Northern harrier, Circus hudsonius  
Sharp-shinned hawk, Accipiter striatus  
Cooper's hawk, Accipiter cooperii  
Northern goshawk, Accipiter gentilis 
Bald eagle, Haliaeetus leucocephalus 
Common black hawk, Buteogallus anthracinus 
Harris's hawk, Parabuteo unicinctus 
Gray hawk, Buteo plagiatus (PP)
Broad-winged hawk, Buteo platypterus(UC)
Swainson's hawk, Buteo swainsoni 
Zone-tailed hawk, Buteo albonotatus 
Red-tailed hawk, Buteo jamaicensis
Rough-legged hawk, Buteo lagopus 
Ferruginous hawk, Buteo regalis

Barn-owls
Order: StrigiformesFamily: Tytonidae

Owls in the family Tytonidae are medium to large owls with large heads and characteristic heart-shaped faces.

Barn owl, Tyto alba (PP)

Owls
Order: StrigiformesFamily: Strigidae

Typical or "true" owls are small to large solitary nocturnal birds of prey. They have large forward-facing eyes and ears, a hawk-like beak, and a conspicuous circle of feathers around each eye called a facial disk.

Flammulated owl, Psiloscops flammeolus 
Western screech-owl, Megascops kennicottii 
Great horned owl, Bubo virginianus
Northern pygmy-owl, Glaucidium gnoma 
Elf owl, Micrathene whitneyi 
Burrowing owl, Athene cunicularia 
Spotted owl, Strix occidentalis 
Long-eared owl, Asio otus (PP)
Northern saw-whet owl, Aegolius acadicus

Kingfishers
Order: CoraciiformesFamily: Alcedinidae

Kingfishers are medium-sized birds with large heads, long, pointed bills, short legs, and stubby tails.

Belted kingfisher, Megaceryle alcyon

Woodpeckers
Order: PiciformesFamily: Picidae

Woodpeckers are small to medium-sized birds with chisel-like beaks, short legs, stiff tails, and long tongues used for capturing insects. Some species have feet with two toes pointing forward and two backward, while several species have only three toes. Many woodpeckers have the habit of tapping noisily on tree trunks with their beaks.

Lewis's woodpecker, Melanerpes lewis 
Red-headed woodpecker, Melanerpes erythrocephalus (PP)
Acorn woodpecker, Melanerpes formicivorus
Williamson's sapsucker, Sphyrapicus thyroideus 
Yellow-bellied sapsucker, Sphyrapicus varius 
Red-naped sapsucker, Sphyrapicus nuchalis 
Downy woodpecker, Dryobates pubescens 
Ladder-backed woodpecker, Dryobates scalaris
Hairy woodpecker, Dryobates villosus
Northern flicker, Colaptes auratus

Falcons and caracaras
Order: FalconiformesFamily: Falconidae

Falconidae is a family of diurnal birds of prey, notably the falcons and caracaras. They differ from hawks, eagles, and kites in that they kill with their beaks instead of their talons.

American kestrel, Falco sparverius  
Merlin, Falco columbarius 
Peregrine falcon, Falco peregrinus  
Prairie falcon, Falco mexicanus

Tyrant flycatchers
Order: PasseriformesFamily: Tyrannidae

Tyrant flycatchers are Passerine birds which occur throughout North and South America. They superficially resemble the Old World flycatchers, but are more robust and have stronger bills. They do not have the sophisticated vocal capabilities of the songbirds. Most, but not all, are rather plain. As the name implies, most are insectivorous.

Ash-throated flycatcher, Myiarchus cinerascens 
Cassin's kingbird, Tyrannus vociferans 
Western kingbird, Tyrannus verticalis 
Scissor-tailed flycatcher, Tyrannus forficatus (PP)
Olive-sided flycatcher, Contopus cooperi 
Greater pewee, Contopus pertinax 
Western wood-pewee, Contopus sordidulus 
Hammond's flycatcher, Empidonax hammondii 
Gray flycatcher, Empidonax wrightii 
Dusky flycatcher, Empidonax oberholseri 
Pacific-slope flycatcher, Empidonax difficilis 
Cordilleran flycatcher, Empidonax occidentalis 
Black phoebe, Sayornis nigricans 
Say's phoebe, Sayornis saya   
Vermilion flycatcher, Pyrocephalus rubinus

Vireos, shrike-babblers, and erpornis
Order: PasseriformesFamily: Vireonidae

The vireos are a group of small to medium-sized passerine birds restricted to the New World, though a few other species in the family are found in Asia. They are typically greenish in color and resemble wood-warblers apart from their heavier bills.

White-eyed vireo, Vireo griseus (PP)
Gray vireo, Vireo vicinior 
Hutton's vireo, Vireo huttoni 
Yellow-throated vireo, Vireo flavifrons 
Cassin's vireo, Vireo cassinii 
Plumbeous vireo, Vireo plumbeus  
Warbling vireo, Vireo gilvus 
Red-eyed vireo, Vireo olivaceus

Shrikes
Order: PasseriformesFamily: Laniidae

Shrikes are passerine birds known for their habit of catching other birds and small animals and impaling the uneaten portions of their bodies on thorns. A shrike's beak is hooked, like that of a typical bird of prey.

Loggerhead shrike, Lanius ludovicianus
Northern shrike, Lanius borealis

Crows, jays, and magpies
Order: PasseriformesFamily: Corvidae

The family Corvidae includes crows, ravens, jays, choughs, magpies, treepies, nutcrackers, and ground jays. Corvids are above average in size among the Passeriformes, and some of the larger species show high levels of intelligence.

Pinyon jay, Gymnorhinus cyanocephalus 
Steller's jay, Cyanocitta stelleri
Blue jay, Cyanocitta cristata
Woodhouse's scrub-jay, Aphelocoma woodhouseii  
Clark's nutcracker, Nucifraga columbiana 
Chihuahuan raven, Corvus cryptoleucus 
Common raven, Corvus corax

Penduline-tits
Order: PasseriformesFamily: Remizidae

The only member of this family in the New World, the verdin is one of the smallest passerines in North America. Verdins are insectivores, and are usually solitary except when they pair up to construct their conspicuous nests.

Verdin, Auriparus flaviceps

Tits, chickadees, and titmice
Order: PasseriformesFamily: Paridae

The Paridae are mainly small stocky woodland species with short stout bills. Some have crests. They are adaptable birds, with a mixed diet including seeds and insects.

Mountain chickadee, Poecile gambeli
Juniper titmouse, Baeolophus ridgwayi 
Black-crested titmouse, Baeolophus atricristatus (PP)

Larks
Order: PasseriformesFamily: Alaudidae

Larks are small terrestrial birds with often extravagant songs and display flights. Most larks are fairly dull in appearance. Their food is insects and seeds.

Horned lark, Eremophila alpestris

Swallows
Order: PasseriformesFamily: Hirundinidae

The family Hirundinidae is adapted to aerial feeding. They have a slender streamlined body, long pointed wings, and a short bill with a wide gape. The feet are adapted to perching rather than walking, and the front toes are partially joined at the base.

Tree swallow, Tachycineta bicolor (UC)
Violet-green swallow, Tachycineta thalassina 
Northern rough-winged swallow, Stelgidopteryx serripennis 
Barn swallow, Hirundo rustica 
Cliff swallow, Petrochelidon pyrrhonota

Long-tailed tits
Order: PasseriformesFamily: Aegithalidae

The long-tailed tits are a family of small passerine birds with medium to long tails. They make woven bag nests in trees. Most eat a mixed diet which includes insects.

Bushtit, Psaltriparus minimus

Kinglets
Order: PasseriformesFamily: Regulidae

The kinglets and "crests" are a small family of birds which resemble some warblers. They are very small insectivorous birds, mostly in the genus Regulus. The adults have colored crowns, giving rise to their name.

Ruby-crowned kinglet, Corthylio calendula
Golden-crowned kinglet, Regulus satrapa

Waxwings
Order: PasseriformesFamily: Bombycillidae

The waxwings are a group of passerine birds with soft silky plumage and unique red tips to some of the wing feathers. In the Bohemian and cedar waxwings, these tips look like sealing wax and give the group its name. These are arboreal birds of northern forests. They live on insects in summer and berries in winter.

Cedar waxwing, Bombycilla cedrorum

Silky-flycatchers
Order: PasseriformesFamily: Ptiliogonatidae

The silky-flycatchers are a small family of passerine birds which occur mainly in Central America. They are related to waxwings and most species have small crests.

Phainopepla, Phainopepla nitens

Nuthatches
Order: PasseriformesFamily: Sittidae

Nuthatches are small woodland birds. They have the unusual ability to climb down trees head first, unlike other birds which can only go upwards. Nuthatches have big heads, short tails, and powerful bills and feet.

Red-breasted nuthatch, Sitta canadensis  
White-breasted nuthatch, Sitta carolinensis
Pygmy nuthatch, Sitta pygmaea

Treecreepers
Order: PasseriformesFamily: Certhiidae

Treecreepers are small woodland birds, brown above and white below. They have thin pointed down-curved bills, which they use to extricate insects from bark. They have stiff tail feathers, like woodpeckers, which they use to support themselves on vertical trees.

Brown creeper, Certhia americana

Gnatcatchers
Order: PasseriformesFamily: Polioptilidae

These dainty birds resemble Old World warblers in their structure and habits, moving restlessly through the foliage seeking insects. The gnatcatchers are mainly soft bluish gray in color and have the typical insectivore's long sharp bill. Many species have distinctive black head patterns (especially males) and long, regularly cocked, black-and-white tails.

Blue-gray gnatcatcher, Polioptila caerulea 
Black-tailed gnatcatcher, Polioptila melanura

Wrens
Order: PasseriformesFamily: Troglodytidae

Wrens are small and inconspicuous birds, except for their loud songs. They have short wings and thin down-turned bills. Several species often hold their tails upright. All are insectivorous.

Rock wren, Salpinctes obsoletus
Canyon wren, Catherpes mexicanus
Cactus wren, Campylorhynchus brunneicapillus
Bewick's wren, Thryomanes bewickii 
Carolina wren, Thryothorus ludovicianus 
House wren, Troglodytes aedon 
Winter wren, Troglodytes hiemalis 
Marsh wren, Cistothorus palustris

Mockingbirds and thrashers
Order: PasseriformesFamily: Mimidae

The mimids are a family of passerine birds which includes thrashers, mockingbirds, tremblers, and the New World catbirds. These birds are notable for their vocalization, especially their remarkable ability to mimic a wide variety of birds and other sounds heard outdoors. The species tend towards dull grays and browns in their appearance.

Gray catbird, Dumetella carolinensis 
Curve-billed thrasher, Toxostoma curvirostre  
Brown thrasher, Toxostoma rufum 
Crissal thrasher, Toxostoma crissale 
Sage thrasher, Oreoscoptes montanus 
Northern mockingbird, Mimus polyglottos

Starlings
Order: PasseriformesFamily: Sturnidae

Starlings and mynas are small to medium-sized Old World passerine birds with strong feet. Their flight is strong and direct and most are very gregarious. Their preferred habitat is fairly open country, and they eat insects and fruit. The plumage of several species is dark with a metallic sheen.

European starling, Sturnus vulgaris (I)

Dippers
Order: PasseriformesFamily: Cinclidae

Dippers are a group of perching birds whose habitat includes aquatic environments in the Americas, Europe, and Asia. These birds have adaptations which allows them to submerge and walk on the bottom to feed on insect larvae.

American dipper, Cinclus mexicanus

Thrushes and allies
Order: PasseriformesFamily: Turdidae

The thrushes are a group of passerine birds that occur mainly but not exclusively in the Old World. They are plump, soft plumaged, small to medium-sized insectivores or sometimes omnivores, often feeding on the ground. Many have attractive songs.

Eastern bluebird, Sialia sialis 
Western bluebird, Sialia mexicana 
Mountain bluebird, Sialia currucoides 
Townsend's solitaire, Myadestes townsendi 
Swainson's thrush, Catharus ustulatus
Hermit thrush, Catharus guttatus
American robin, Turdus migratorius  
Varied thrush, Ixoreus naevius

Old World sparrows
Order: PasseriformesFamily: Passeridae

Old World sparrows are small passerine birds. In general, sparrows tend to be small plump brownish or grayish birds with short tails and short powerful beaks. Sparrows are seed eaters, but they also consume small insects.

House sparrow, Passer domesticus (I)

Wagtails and pipits
Order: PasseriformesFamily: Motacillidae

Motacillidae is a family of small passerine birds with medium to long tails. They include the wagtails, longclaws, and pipits. They are slender ground-feeding insectivores of open country.

American pipit, Anthus rubescens

Finches, euphonias, and allies
Order: PasseriformesFamily: Fringillidae

Finches are seed-eating passerine birds that are small to moderately large and have a strong beak, usually conical and in some species very large. All have twelve tail feathers and nine primaries. These birds have a bouncing flight with alternating bouts of flapping and gliding on closed wings, and most sing well.

Evening grosbeak, Coccothraustes vespertinus  
Pine grosbeak, Pinicola enucleator 
House finch, Haemorhous mexicanus 
Purple finch, Haemorhous purpureus 
Cassin's finch, Haemorhous cassinii 
Red crossbill, Loxia curvirostra 
Pine siskin, Spinus pinus  
Lesser goldfinch, Spinus psaltria
Lawrence's goldfinch, Spinus lawrencei 
American goldfinch, Spinus tristis

Longspurs and snow buntings
Order: PasseriformesFamily: Calcariidae

The Calcariidae are a group of passerine birds that had been traditionally grouped with the New World sparrows, but differ in a number of respects and are usually found in open grassy areas.

Chestnut-collared longspur, Calcarius ornatus
Thick-billed longspur, Rhynchophanes mccownii (PP)

New World sparrows
Order: PasseriformesFamily: Passerellidae

Until 2017, these species were considered part of the family Emberizidae. Most of the species are known as sparrows, but these birds are not closely related to the Old World sparrows which are in the family Passeridae. Many of these have distinctive head patterns.

Cassin's sparrow, Peucaea cassinii  
Grasshopper sparrow, Ammodramus savannarum 
Black-throated sparrow, Amphispiza bilineata
Lark sparrow, Chondestes grammacus 
Lark bunting, Calamospiza melanocorys 
Chipping sparrow, Spizella passerina
Clay-colored sparrow, Spizella pallida 
Black-chinned sparrow, Spizella atrogularis  
Field sparrow, Spizella pusilla 
Brewer's sparrow, Spizella breweri 
Fox sparrow, Passerella iliaca (PP)
American tree sparrow, Spizelloides arborea 
Dark-eyed junco, Junco hyemalis 
Yellow-eyed junco, Junco phaeonotus 
White-crowned sparrow, Zonotrichia leucophrys 
Golden-crowned sparrow, Zonotrichia atricapilla 
White-throated sparrow, Zonotrichia albicollis 
Sagebrush sparrow, Artemisiospiza nevadensis 
Vesper sparrow, Pooecetes gramineus 
Savannah sparrow, Passerculus sandwichensis 
Song sparrow, Melospiza melodia 
Lincoln's sparrow, Melospiza lincolnii 
Swamp sparrow, Melospiza georgiana 
Canyon towhee, Melozone fuscus
Rufous-crowned sparrow, Aimophila ruficeps 
Green-tailed towhee, Pipilo chlorurus 
Spotted towhee, Pipilo maculatus  
Eastern towhee, Pipilo erythrophthalmus

Yellow-breasted chat
Order: PasseriformesFamily: Icteriidae

This species was historically placed in the wood-warblers (Parulidae) but nonetheless most authorities were unsure if it belonged there. It was placed in its own family in 2017.

Yellow-breasted chat, Icteria virens

Troupials and allies
Order: PasseriformesFamily: Icteridae

The icterids are a group of small to medium-sized, often colorful passerine birds restricted to the New World and include the grackles, New World blackbirds, and New World orioles. Most species have black as a predominant plumage color which is often enlivened by yellow, orange, or red.

Yellow-headed blackbird, Xanthocephalus xanthocephalus 
Eastern meadowlark, Sturnella magna
Western meadowlark, Sturnella neglecta 
Orchard oriole, Icterus spurius (PP)
Hooded oriole, Icterus cucullatus 
Baltimore oriole, Icterus galbula 
Scott's oriole, Icterus parisorum 
Red-winged blackbird, Agelaius phoeniceus 
Bronzed cowbird, Molothrus aeneus 
Brown-headed cowbird, Molothrus ater 
Brewer's blackbird, Euphagus cyanocephalus
Common grackle, Quiscalus quiscula 
Great-tailed grackle, Quiscalus mexicanus

New World warblers
Order: PasseriformesFamily: Parulidae

The wood-warblers are a group of small often colorful passerine birds restricted to the New World. Most are arboreal, but some are more terrestrial. Most members of this family are insectivores.

Ovenbird, Seiurus aurocapilla (PP)
Worm-eating warbler, Helmitheros vermivorus 
Northern waterthrush, Parkesia noveboracensis 
Black-and-white warbler, Mniotilta varia 
Orange-crowned warbler, Leiothlypis celata 
Colima warbler, Leiothlypis crissalis 
Nashville warbler, Leiothlypis ruficapilla 
Virginia's warbler, Leiothlypis virginiae 
MacGillivray's warbler, Geothlypis tolmiei 
Kentucky warbler, Geothlypis formosa 
Common yellowthroat, Geothlypis trichas 
Hooded warbler, Setophaga citrina 
American redstart, Setophaga ruticilla 
Northern parula, Setophaga americana 
Yellow warbler, Setophaga petechia 
Chestnut-sided warbler, Setophaga pensylvanica 
Black-throated blue warbler, Setophaga caerulescens
Pine warbler, Setophaga pinus (PP)
Yellow-rumped warbler, Setophaga coronata  
Grace's warbler, Setophaga graciae 
Black-throated gray warbler, Setophaga nigrescens 
Townsend's warbler, Setophaga townsendi 
Hermit warbler, Setophaga occidentalis 
Black-throated green warbler, Setophaga virens (PP)
Wilson's warbler, Cardellina pusilla 
Red-faced warbler, Cardellina rubrifrons 
Painted redstart, Myioborus pictus

Cardinals and allies
Order: PasseriformesFamily: Cardinalidae

The cardinals are a family of robust seed-eating birds with strong bills. They are typically associated with open woodland. The sexes usually have distinct plumages.

Hepatic tanager, Piranga flava 
Summer tanager, Piranga rubra 
Scarlet tanager, Piranga olivacea 
Western tanager, Piranga ludoviciana 
Northern cardinal, Cardinalis cardinalis 
Pyrrhuloxia, Cardinalis sinuatus  
Rose-breasted grosbeak, Pheucticus ludovicianus 
Black-headed grosbeak, Pheucticus melanocephalus 
Blue grosbeak, Passerina caerulea 
Lazuli bunting, Passerina amoena
Indigo bunting, Passerina cyanea 
Varied bunting, Passerina versicolor (PP)

See also
List of birds of Texas

References

External links
Texas Ornithological Society
Texas Bird Records Committee
Official Texas State List

Texas, Guadalupe Mountains
Birds, Guadalupe Mountains National Park
Guadalupe Mountains National Park